The swinging Atwood's machine (SAM) is a mechanism that resembles a simple Atwood's machine except that one of the masses is allowed to swing in a two-dimensional plane, producing a dynamical system that is chaotic for some system parameters and initial conditions.

Specifically, it comprises two masses (the pendulum, mass  and counterweight, mass )  connected by an inextensible, massless string suspended on two frictionless pulleys of zero radius such that the pendulum can swing freely around its pulley without colliding with the counterweight.

However, the swinging Atwood's machine with  has a large parameter space of conditions that lead to a variety of motions that can be classified as terminating or non-terminating, periodic, quasiperiodic or chaotic, bounded or unbounded, singular or non-singular due to the pendulum's reactive centrifugal force counteracting the counterweight's weight. Research on the SAM started as part of a 1982 senior thesis entitled Smiles and Teardrops (referring to the shape of some trajectories of the system) by Nicholas Tufillaro at Reed College, directed by David J. Griffiths.

Equations of motion

The swinging Atwood's machine is a system with two degrees of freedom. We may derive its equations of motion using either Hamiltonian mechanics or Lagrangian mechanics. Let the swinging mass be  and the non-swinging mass be . The kinetic energy of the system, is:

The potential energy  is solely due to the acceleration due to gravity:

We may then write down the Lagrangian, and the Hamiltonian,  of the system:

We can then express the Hamiltonian in terms of the canonical momenta, :

First, the  equation:

And the  equation:

We simplify the equations by defining the mass ratio . The above then becomes:

Notice that in both of these derivations, if one sets  and angular velocity  to zero, the resulting special case is the regular non-swinging Atwood machine:

However, due to energy conservation, the phase space is constrained to three dimensions.

System with massive pulleys
If the pulleys in the system are taken to have moment of inertia  and radius , the Hamiltonian of the SAM is then:

Where t is the effective total mass of the system,

This reduces to the version above when  and  become zero. The equations of motion are now:

where .

Integrability
Hamiltonian systems can be classified as integrable and nonintegrable. SAM is integrable when the mass ratio . For many other values of the mass ratio (and initial conditions) SAM displays chaotic motion.

When  is small (near vertical), the trajectory describes a "teardrop", when it is large, it describes a "heart". These trajectories can be exactly solved algebraically, which is unusual for a system with a non-linear Hamiltonian.

Trajectories
The swinging mass of the swinging Atwood's machine undergoes interesting trajectories or orbits when subject to different initial conditions, and for different mass ratios. These include periodic orbits and collision orbits.

Nonsingular orbits
For certain conditions, system exhibits complex harmonic motion. The orbit is called nonsingular if the swinging mass does not touch the pulley.

Periodic orbits

When the different harmonic components in the system are in phase, the resulting trajectory is simple and periodic, such as the "smile" trajectory, which resembles that of an ordinary pendulum, and various loops. In general a periodic orbit exists when the following is satisfied:

The simplest case of periodic orbits is the "smile" orbit, which Tufillaro termed Type A orbits in his 1984 paper.

Singular orbits
The motion is singular if at some point, the swinging mass passes through the origin. Since the system is invariant under time reversal and translation, it is equivalent to say that the pendulum starts at the origin and is fired outwards:

As such, special techniques must be used to rigorously analyze these cases.

The following are plots of arbitrarily selected singular orbits.

Collision orbits

Collision (or terminating singular) orbits are subset of singular orbits formed when the swinging mass is ejected from its pivot with an initial velocity, such that it returns to the pivot (i.e. it collides with the pivot):

The simplest case of collision orbits are the ones with a mass ratio of 3, which will always return symmetrically to the origin after being ejected from the origin, and were termed Type B orbits in Tufillaro's initial paper. They were also referred to as teardrop, heart, or rabbit-ear orbits because of their appearance.

When the swinging mass returns to the origin, the counterweight mass,  must instantaneously change direction, causing an infinite tension in the connecting string. Thus we may consider the motion to terminate at this time.

Boundedness
For any initial position, it can be shown that the swinging mass is bounded by a curve that is a conic section. The pivot is always a focus of this bounding curve. The equation for this curve can be derived by analyzing the energy of the system, and using conservation of energy. The total energy of the system is therefore:

However, notice that in the boundary case, the velocity of the swinging mass is zero. Hence we have:

To see that it is the equation of a conic section, we isolate for :

Note that the numerator is a constant dependent only on the initial position in this case, as we have assumed the initial condition to be at rest. However, the energy constant  can also be calculated for nonzero initial velocity, and the equation still holds in all cases. For , this is an ellipse, and the system is bounded and the swinging mass always stays within the ellipse. For , it is a parabola and for  it is a hyperbola; in either of these cases, it is not bounded. As  gets arbitrarily large, the bounding curve approaches a circle. The region enclosed by the curve is known as the Hill's region.

Recent three dimensional extension

A new integrable case for the problem of three dimensional Swinging Atwood Machine (3D-SAM) was announced in 2016. Like the 2D version, the problem is integrable when .

References

Further reading
Almeida, M.A., Moreira, I.C. and Santos, F.C. (1998) "On the Ziglin-Yoshida analysis for some classes of homogeneous hamiltonian systems", Brazilian Journal of Physics Vol.28 n.4  São Paulo Dec.
Barrera, Emmanuel Jan (2003) Dynamics of a Double-Swinging Atwood's machine, B.S. Thesis,  National Institute of Physics, University of the Philippines.
Babelon, O, M. Talon, MC Peyranere (2010), "Kowalevski's analysis of a swinging Atwood's machine," Journal of Physics A: Mathematical and Theoretical Vol. 43 (8).
Bruhn, B. (1987) "Chaos and order in weakly coupled systems of nonlinear oscillators," Physica Scripta Vol.35(1).
Casasayas, J., N. B. Tufillaro, and A. Nunes (1989) "Infinity manifold of a swinging Atwood's machine," European Journal of Physics Vol.10(10), p173.
Casasayas, J, A. Nunes, and N. B. Tufillaro (1990) "Swinging Atwood's machine: integrability and dynamics," Journal de Physique Vol.51, p1693.
Chowdhury, A. Roy and M. Debnath (1988) "Swinging Atwood Machine. Far- and near-resonance region", International Journal of Theoretical Physics, Vol. 27(11), p1405-1410.
Griffiths D. J. and T. A. Abbott (1992) "Comment on ""A surprising mechanics demonstration,"" American Journal of Physics Vol.60(10), p951-953.
Moreira, I.C. and M.A. Almeida (1991) "Noether symmetries and the Swinging Atwood Machine", Journal of Physics II France 1, p711-715.
Nunes, A.,  J. Casasayas, and N. B. Tufillaro (1995) "Periodic orbits of the integrable swinging Atwood's machine," American Journal of Physics Vol.63(2), p121-126.
Ouazzani-T.H., A. and Ouzzani-Jamil, M., (1995) "Bifurcations of Liouville tori of an integrable case of swinging Atwood's machine," Il Nuovo Cimento B Vol. 110 (9).
Olivier, Pujol, JP Perez, JP Ramis, C. Simo, S. Simon, JA Weil (2010), "Swinging Atwood's Machine: Experimental and numerical results, and a theoretical study," Physica D 239, pp. 1067–1081.
Sears, R. (1995) "Comment on "A surprising mechanics demonstration," American Journal of Physics, Vol. 63(9), p854-855.
Yehia, H.M., (2006) "On the integrability of the motion of a heavy particle on a tilted cone and the swinging Atwood machine", Mechanics Research Communications Vol. 33 (5), p711–716.

External links
Example of use in undergraduate research: symplectic integrators 
Imperial College Course
Oscilaciones en la máquina de Atwood
"Smiles and Teardrops" (1982)
2007 Workshop
2010 Videos of an experimental Swinging Atwood's Machine
Update on a Swinging Atwood's Machine at 2010 APS Meeting, 8:24 AM, Friday 19 March 2010, Portland, OR
Interactive web application of the Swinging Atwood's Machine
Open source Java code for running the Swinging Atwood's Machine

Hamiltonian mechanics